The Men's 200 Butterfly at the 10th FINA World Swimming Championships (25 m) was swum on 19 December 2010 in Dubai, United Arab Emirates. 44 individuals swam in the preliminary heats in the morning, with the top-8 finishers advancing to the final that evening.

At the start of the event, the existing World (WR) and Championship records (CR) were:

Results

Heats

Final

References

Butterfly 200 metre, Men's
World Short Course Swimming Championships